The Republic of Honduras is organized according to Title I: On the State of the Honduran Constitution of 1982. According to Title V: Branches of the Government, the three administrative branches are the legislative, executive and judicial. The legislative branch is the Congress of Deputies, which is elected by direct vote. Executive power is held by the president of Honduras or, in their absence, by one of the three vice-presidents. The judicial branch is composed of a supreme court, a court of appeals and other courts specified by the law.

President 
The president, the head of state, of government and supreme administrative authority, is chosen by its citizens. The current president is Xiomara Castro who was preceded by Juan Orlando Hernández. The vice-presidents are Salvador Nasralla, Doris Gutiérrez, and Renato Florentino.

Responsibilities 

 To comply with and enforce the Constitution, treaties and conventions, laws, and other legal provisions
 To represent and direct the policies of the state
 To safeguard the independence and honor of the republic and the integrity and inviolability of its territory
 To maintain the peace and internal security of the republic and to repel attacks or external aggression
 To freely appoint and dismiss secretaries and deputy secretaries of the cabinet, along with other officials and employees whose appointment is not assigned to other authorities
 To convene the national congress in special sessions (through the permanent committee) or to propose the continuance of regular sessions
 To restrict or suspend the exercise of rights in agreement with the Council of Ministers, subject to the constitution
 To send messages to the congress at any time by personal appearance, and in writing when each legislative session begins
 To participate in the enacting of laws by introducing bills in the congress through the secretaries of the cabinet
 To give to the legislative and judicial powers and the supreme electoral tribunal the aid required to make their resolutions effective
 To issue directives, decrees, regulations and resolutions according to law
 To direct foreign policy and relations
 To conclude treaties and agreements and to ratify (following approval by the congress) international treaties of a political and military nature, those relating to national territory and sovereignty and concessions, those entailing financial obligations for the public treasury, those requiring amendment or repeal of a constitutional or legal provision and those requiring legislation for implementation
 To appoint (in accordance with the foreign-service law) the heads of diplomatic and consular missions, who shall be Honduran nationals by birth except for honorary posts or joint representatives of Honduras with other states
 To receive the heads of foreign diplomatic missions and representatives of international organizations; to issue the exequatur to (and withdraw it from) consuls of other states
 To command the armed forces the commander-in-chief and adopt measures necessary for the defense of the republic
 To declare war and make peace during a recess of the congress, which must be subsequently convened
 To oversee the official behavior of public officials and employees for the security and prestige of the government and state
 To administer the public treasury
 To adopt economic and financial measures when the national interest so requires and to give an account to the congress
 To negotiate loans and conclude contracts following approval by the congress, when appropriate
 To draw up the national development plan, discuss it with the council of ministers, submit it to the national congress for approval and direct and execute it
 To regulate tariffs according to law
 To pardon and commute sentences according to law
 To confer declarations according to law
 To ensure that state revenues are collected and to regulate their investment according to law
 To publish a quarterly statement of income and expenditure of public revenue
 To organize, direct, orient and promote public education, eradicate illiteracy and provide and improve technical education
 To adopt measures for the promotion, recovery and rehabilitation of public health and the prevention of disease
 To direct the economic and financial policy of the state
 To supervise and control banks, insurance companies and investment houses through a national banking and insurance commission whose membership and operation shall be governed by law, and to appoint the president and vice-presidents of the state banks according to law
 To prescribe measures and provisions to promote agrarian reform and improve productivity in rural areas
 To sanction, veto, promulgate and publish laws approved by the congress
 To direct and support economic and social integration, national and international, to improve the living conditions of the Honduran people
 To create, maintain and suppress public services, taking necessary measures for their efficient operation
 To confer military ranks from second lieutenant to captain, inclusive
 To see that the armed forces are apolitical, professional and obedient
 To issue and cancel naturalization papers authorized by the executive branch, according to law
 To award pensions, bonuses and allowances, according to law
 To confer legal status on civil organizations, according to law
 To ensure harmony between capital and labor
 To fix and revise the minimum wage, according to law
 To permit or deny, following authorization by the congress, transit through Honduran territory of foreign troops
 To permit (following authorization by the congress) the departure of Honduran troops to serve in foreign territory, in accordance with international treaties and conventions for the maintenance of peace
 Other powers and duties conferred by the constitution and legislation

Ministries and secretaries

General budget 

In January 2014, the government of Honduras approved a general budget of 183,635,281,000 lempiras ($9 billion), allocated as follows:

179.681 million for the executive branch
1.864 million for the judicial branch 
2.089 million for the legislative branch

See also
 Politics of Honduras
 Elections in Honduras
 Economy of Honduras
 Government of Honduras
 List of legislatures by country
 Honduras Presidential House
 Ministry of Finance (Honduras)
 Secretary of State for Culture, Arts and Sports

References

External links 
 Constitución de la República de Honduras, 1982 (con reformas)  
 Honduras' 1982 Constitution with amendments
 Honduras Executive

Politics of Honduras
Honduras
National cabinets
Current governments